Silvery Moon is a song by Australian rock band Sherbet, released in August 1974 as the third and final single from the band's third studio album, Slipstream. The song reached number 5 on the Kent Music Report

The song was written by Garth Porter and Clive Shakespeare.

Track listing

Personnel 
 Daryl Braithwaite - Lead vocals
 Tony Mitchell - Bass, vocals
 Garth Porter - Keyboards, vocals
 Alan Sandow - Drums
 Clive Shakespeare - Guitar, vocals

Charts

Weekly charts

Year-end charts

References 

Sherbet (band) songs
1974 singles
1974 songs
Festival Records singles
Infinity Records singles
Songs written by Garth Porter
Songs written by Clive Shakespeare
Song recordings produced by Richard Batchens